Diego Gama may refer to:
Diego Gama de Oliveira (born 1983) Brazilian footballer
Diego Alberto Gama García (born 1996) Mexican footballer